This is a List of radio stations in the Federated States of Micronesia.

AM
 999 V6AF Pohnpei (Christian)
 1260 V6AG Pohnpei Joy Radio (formerly on 999 AM)
 1350 V6A Moen (Christian)
 1449 V6AH Kolonia/Pohnpei https://web.archive.org/web/20070930185423/http://www.fm/ppbc/V6AH/V6AH.htm
 1494 V6AI Kolonia/Yap http://www.fm/yap/radio.htm
 1503 V6AJ Kosrae/Tofol http://www.fm/kosrae/radio.htm (formerly 1584 AM)
 1593 V6AK Chuuk/Weno

SW
4.755 V6MP (currently silent)

FM
88.5 V6MA Pohnpei (Christian)
 88.9 V6JY Makiy, Yap (Christian)
 89.7 V6AA Colonia, Yap
 101.0 V6AV Pohnpei (Christian)
 104.0 V6AF Pohnpei (Christian)

Micronesia
radio stations in Micronesia